The 1966–67 FIBA European Cup Winners' Cup was the inaugural edition of FIBA's 2nd-tier level European-wide professional club basketball competition, contested between national domestic cup champions. It was contested by 19 teams, and it ran from December 1966, to April 1967. Ignis Varese defeated Maccabi Tel Aviv, in the final, to become the competition's first champion.

Participants

First round 

|}

*Duvbo withdrew before the first leg and Dinamo București received a forfeit (2-0) in both games.

**Originally, the champion of the Moroccan Cup was drawn to play against the Italian Champion, but no team of the North African country was designated to play this competition. Therefore, Ignis Varese received a forfeit (2-0).

Second round

|}

Quarterfinals

|}

* After a 152 aggregate drew, a third decisive game was held in which Maccabi Tel Aviv won 75–51.

Semifinals

|}

Finals

|}

References

External links 
FIBA European Cup Winner's Cup 1966–67 linguasport.com
FIBA European Cup Winner's Cup 1966–67

FIBA Saporta Cup
Cup